Animaniacs Game Pack is a 1997 computer game based on the animated television series Animaniacs. It features five arcade games starring the Warner kids, Yakko, Wakko and Dot. It was published by Warner Bros. Interactive Entertainment and developed by Funnybone Interactive. Voices for all characters in the games are provided by the voice actors who performed the roles for the television series. It was the first Animaniacs media to use digital ink and paint, mostly used in cutscenes. Also, it used 3D pre-rendered backgrounds in some games

Games

Belchinator Too
This game stars Wakko Warner as the protagonist and The Brain as the antagonist. The Brain has once again decided to attempt world domination by creating robots using the Acme Labs. However, his creations eventually turns against him and takes him prisoner, planning to use his vast intellect to help them destroy the world. Wakko must stop the robots by unleashing the power of his belches, fueled by the assorted snacks (power-ups) he finds along the way.

As the longest game by far, this is the only game in the compilation to have save files.

Prop Shop Drop
This game puts Yakko Warner to work collecting movie props for a crabby foreman. Players control Yakko on a bicycle as he rides through the studio, collecting the props and avoiding obstacles. As Yakko proceeds, he can upgrade to a motorcycle or racecar to cover ground more quickly.

Smoocher
In Smoocher, Dot Warner must turn her nightmares into good dreams by blowing "smooches" (hearts) at the enemies to freeze them. Once they are frozen, Dot can run over them to eliminate them. She has only a limited supply of smooches and must collect more throughout the game. If she jumps and hits a stick of TNT, it will freeze every enemy on the screen.

Baloney's Balloon Bop
Baloney's Balloon Bop stars all three Warners as they try to pop balloons by bouncing Yakko upward on to a trampoline held by Wakko and Dot. Baloney the dinosaur runs along the bottom of the screen, under Wakko and Dot, and Yakko will lose a life if he misses the trampoline and is caught by Baloney.  Some balloons contain power-ups, while others release anvils that will stun Baloney for a moment if they land on him. On later screens, unbreakable steel blocks appear among the balloons.

Tee Off Mini Golf
The player controls Dot as she plays through a nine-hole miniature golf course loaded with unusual obstacles.

Cast
 Rob Paulsen as Yakko Warner, Dr. Scratchansniff, and Pinky
 Jess Harnell as Wakko Warner
 Tress MacNeille as Dot Warner
 Maurice LaMarche as The Brain, Foreman, and Wakko's belches
 Jeff Bennett as Baloney the Dinosaur

References

External links
Official website

1997 video games
Miniature golf video games
Windows games
Windows-only games
Video games based on Animaniacs
Video games developed in the United States
Funnybone Interactive games